Cricklewood Wanderers Football Club is a football club based in Wembley, London, England.

History
The club was founded in 2011 by a group of young people from north-west London. and joined Division One (Central and East) of the Middlesex County League. In 2012–13 they won the division, earning promotion to the Premier Division. The club also gained FA Charter Standard Award status. They entered the FA Vase for the first time in 2015. The 2018-19 season saw the club reach the final of the Alec Smith Premier Division Cup but lost out to St. Panteleimon F.C. on penalties.

Ground

The club play their home games at Vale Farm. The ground is also used by Wembley F.C. and was a former ground of Hendon F.C.

Honours
Middlesex County League
Division One (Central and East) champions 2012–13

Records
Best FA Vase performance: Second round, 2015–16

References

Football clubs in England
Football clubs in London
Association football clubs established in 2011
2011 establishments in England
Middlesex County Football League